Atteva pustulella is a moth of the  family Attevidae. It is found from Costa Rica, where it meets Atteva aurea, southwards to Uruguay and Argentina. It is also present in the Antilles. There are also several reports from Dominica, Jamaica, Haiti and Martinique.

The larvae feed only on new shoots of Simarouba amara. There are records for 
Ailanthus altissima in Argentina (Berg 1880), Castela erecta in Saint Croix, Antilles (Walsingham, 1914), Castela peninsularis, Castela polyandra and Castela emory in the United States (Powell et al. 1973), but these are doubtful records for which either the host or the moth species may be misidentified (Becker 2009).

External links
A review of the New World Atteva (Walker) moths (Yponomeutidae, Attevinae)
Identity of the ailanthus webworm moth (Lepidoptera, Yponomeutidae), a complex of two species: evidence from DNA barcoding, morphology and ecology

Attevidae
Moths described in 1787